The 1981 Maryland Terrapins football team represented the University of Maryland in the 1981 NCAA Division I-A football season. In their 10th and final season under head coach Jerry Claiborne, the Terrapins compiled a 4–6–1 record, finished in third place in the Atlantic Coast Conference, and outscored their opponents 232 to 194. The team's statistical leaders included Boomer Esiason with 1,635 passing yards, Charlie Wysocki with 715 rushing yards, and Russell Davis with 498 receiving yards.

Schedule

Roster

References

Maryland
Maryland Terrapins football seasons
Maryland Terrapins football